Binny Sharma is an Indian television actress. She was the female lead in Sanjog Se Bani Sangini. and Tujh Sang Preet Lagai Sajna (Sahara One). Recently she played the role of Prathibha in Hello Pratibha and in  the timeliners on youtube web series.

Shows
She was in Dance India Dance Season 2 as a contestant
2010–11 Sanjog Se Bani Sangini as Gauri
2012-2013 Tujh Sang Preet Lagai Sajna (Sahara One) as Meera/Bijli
2015 Hello Pratibha as Pratibha

References

External links
 

Living people
Year of birth missing (living people)
Place of birth missing (living people)
Indian television actresses